Knuckle Up may refer to:
3 Ninjas Knuckle Up, a 1993 comedy film directed by Shin Sang-ok
Knuckle Up, a 2003 album by Black Pegasus
"Knuckle Up", a story arc in the comic book series Scalped